Walter W. Kingham (October 4, 1908 – October 11, 1997) was an American politician. He served as a Republican member of the Wyoming House of Representatives.

Life and career 
Kingham was born in Cheyenne, Wyoming. He attended Cheyenne High School and the University of Wyoming.

In 1953, Kingham was elected to the Wyoming House of Representatives, representing Natrona County, Wyoming.

Kingham was managing director of the Wyoming Truck Association. He was also executive secretary of the Wyoming Association of Municipalities.

Kingham died in October 1997, at the age of 89.

References 

1908 births
1997 deaths
Politicians from Cheyenne, Wyoming
Republican Party members of the Wyoming House of Representatives
20th-century American politicians
University of Wyoming alumni